The cloche hat or simply cloche is a fitted, bell-shaped hat for women that was invented in 1908 by milliner Caroline Reboux. They were especially popular from about 1922 to 1933. Its name is derived from cloche, the French word for "bell". 

The popularity and influence of cloche hats was at its peak during the early twentieth century. Couture houses like Lanvin and Molyneux opened ateliers to join milliners in manufacturing hats that precisely matched their clothing designs.  The hats even shaped hairstyles: the Eton crop – the short, slicked-down cut worn by Josephine Baker – became popular because it was ideal to showcase the hats' shape.

Design

Cloche hats were usually made of felt so that they conformed to the head, and were typically designed to be worn low on the forehead, with the wearer's eyes only slightly below the brim. In later years, a summer cloche might be made from sisal or straw. Cloches could also be made of beads or lace for evening wear, for cocktails, dancing or even for bridal wear.

The contemporaneous Art Deco style often influenced the outline of the brim or the style of seams. While commonly worn plain, allowing the cut and shape of a well-made hat to take precedence, a cloche could be decorated with appliqués, embroidery, jeweled brooches, scarves, fans of feathers, or similar accents. By the end of the 1920s, it became fashionable to turn the brims on cloche hats upwards. This style remained prevalent until the cloche hat went out of fashion around 1933 or '34.

Often, different styles of ribbons affixed to the hats indicated different messages about the wearer. Several popular messages included: An arrow-like ribbon which indicated a girl was single but had already given her heart to someone, a firm knot which signaled marriage or a flamboyant bow which indicated the wearer was single and interested in mingling.

Later fashion

The cloche enjoyed a second vogue in the 1960s. In the late 1980s, newly invented models of the cloche, such as Patrick Kelly's version with a buttoned brim, made a minor resurgence. 

Cloche hats were also featured in the  Fall 2007 collections of many designers; Elle magazine called the cloche hat the "haute accessory of the moment" in its September 2007 issue.

See also
 Mushroom hat
 Salvation Army bonnet

References
Notes

External links
Photographs of cloche hats from the 1920s at the University of Houston Digital Library: Photo 1, Photo 2, Photo 3

Hats
1920s fashion
History of clothing (Western fashion)